is a feminine Japanese given name. It can have many different meaning depending on the kanji characters used and may also be written using the hiragana and katakana writing systems. Different variations of the name include those listed below.

Possible writings
美沙子, "beauty, fine sand, child"
海沙子, "sea, fine sand, child"
巳砂子, "sign of the snake, sand, child"
実冴子, "truth, serene, skillful, child"
美咲子, "beauty, blossom, child"
魅佐子, "fascination, help, child"

People with the given name
, Japanese javelin thrower
, Japanese actress and essayist
, Japanese long-distance runner
, Japanese singer, songwriter and pianist
, Japanese actress
, Japanese women's basketball player
 Misako Takashima, Japanese manga artist, writer and illustrator
, Japanese swimmer
, Japanese actress
, Japanese voice actress
, Japanese actress
, Japanese nurse, model, and President of the Japan Lolita Association for lolita fashion

Fictional characters
Misako, a character in the animated series Ninjago: Masters of Spinjitzu
, a character in the manga series Kodocha
, a character in the anime series Psycho-Pass

Japanese feminine given names